The 2016 Brest Challenger was a professional tennis tournament played on hard courts. It was the second edition of the tournament which was part of the 2016 ATP Challenger Tour. It took place in Brest, France between 17 and 23 October 2016.

Singles main-draw entrants

Seeds

 1 Rankings are as of October 10, 2016.

Other entrants
The following players received wildcards into the singles main draw:
  Evan Furness
  Corentin Moutet
  Laurent Lokoli

The following players received entry using special exemptions:
  Stefanos Tsitsipas
  Maxime Janvier

The following players received entry from the qualifying draw:
  Grégoire Jacq
  Romain Jouan
  Yann Marti
  Maximilian Neuchrist

The following players entered as a lucky losers:
  Norbert Gombos
  Sander Gillé

Champions

Singles

  Norbert Gombos def.  Yannik Reuter, 7–5, 6–2

Doubles

  Sander Arends /  Mateusz Kowalczyk def.  Marco Chiudinelli /  Luca Vanni, 	6–7(2–7), 6–3, [10–5]

References

Brest Challenger
Brest Challenger
2016 in French tennis